Cura is a surname, and may refer to:

 Ben Cura (born 1988), British film, television and theatre actor
  (born 2004), Argentinian musician
 Francesco Cura (born 1977), American actor, singer, and fashion model
 John Cura
 José Cura (born 1962), operatic tenor, conductor, director, scenographer and photographer
 Maria Renee Cura (died 2007), Argentinian geographer, writer, and Indologist
  (born 1972), French actor
 Verónica Cura (born 1970), film producer, production manager, and production designer

History 
Cura is a noble ancient Roman family name.

Etymology 
Cura is the name of a divine figure whose name means "Care" or "Concern" in Latin. Hyginus seems to have created both the personification and story for his Fabulae, poem 220.

Origin 
1. Latin: for "care", "cure", or "concern". 2. Spanish and Portuguese: from cura "priest". 3. Italian: probably a habitational name from Cura Carpignano in Pavia province, or other places named with this word.

Given names 
Spanish 38%; Portuguese 11%; Italian 9%. Jose (4), Pedro (3), Cayetano (2), Cristina (2), Miguel (2), Alfonso, Alicia, Bernardo, Enrique, Estela, Evangelina, Genaro; Joao; Aldo, Antonio, Elio, Federico, Gino, Silvio.(number of times this surname appears in a sample database of 88.7 million names, representing one third of the 1997 US population)

See also 
 Cura Ocllo (died 1539), Inca queen
 Cura (disambiguation)
 La Cura (disambiguation)

References